Stethorus punctillum, known generally as the lesser mite destroyer or spider mite destroyer, is a species of lady beetle in the family Coccinellidae. It is found in Africa, Europe and Northern Asia (excluding China), Southern Asia, and North America.

References

Further reading

External links

 

Coccinellidae
Beetles of Africa
Beetles of Asia
Beetles of Europe
Beetles of North America
Beetles described in 1891
Taxa named by Julius Weise
Articles created by Qbugbot